A check dam is a small, sometimes temporary, dam constructed across a swale, drainage ditch, or waterway to counteract erosion by reducing water flow velocity. Check dams themselves are not a type of new technology; rather, they are an ancient technique dating from the second century A.D. Check dams are typically, though not always, implemented in a system of several dams situated at regular intervals across the area of interest.

Function 
A check dam placed in the ditch, swale, or channel interrupts the flow of water and flattens the gradient of the channel, thereby reducing the velocity. In turn, this obstruction induces infiltration and reduces eroding. They can be used not only to slow flow velocity but also to distribute flows across a swale to avoid preferential paths and guide flows toward vegetation. Although some sedimentation may result behind the dam, check dams do not primarily function as sediment-trapping devices.

For instance, on the Graliwdo River in Ethiopia, an increase of hydraulic roughness by check dams and water transmission losses in deposited sediments is responsible for the delay of runoff to reach the lower part of the river channels. The reduction of peak runoff discharge was larger in the river segment with check dams and vegetation (minus 12%) than in segment without treatment (minus 5.5%). Reduction of total runoff volume was also larger in the river with check dams than in the untreated river. The implementation of check dams combined with vegetation reduced peak flow discharge and total runoff volume as large parts of runoff infiltrated in the sediments deposited behind the check dams. As gully check dams are implemented in a large areas of northern Ethiopia, this contributes to groundwater recharge and increased river base flow.

Applications

Grade control mechanism 

Check dams have traditionally been implemented in two environments: across channel bottoms and on hilly slopes. Check dams are used primarily to control water velocity, conserve soil, and improve land. They are used when other flow-control practices, such as lining the channel or creating bioswales, are impractical. Accordingly, they are commonly used in degrading temporary channels, in which permanent stabilization is impractical and infeasible in terms of resource allocation and funding due to the short life period. They are also used when construction delays and weather conditions prevent timely installation of other erosion control practices. This is typically seen during the construction process of large-scale permanent dams or erosion control. As such, check dams serve as temporary grade-control mechanisms along waterways until resolute stabilization is established or along permanent swales that need protection prior to installation of a non-erodible lining.

Water quality control mechanism 
Many check dams tend to form stream pools. Under low-flow circumstances, water either infiltrates into the ground, evaporates, or seeps through or under the dam. Under high flow – flood – conditions, water flows over or through the structure. Coarse and medium-grained sediment from runoff tends to be deposited behind check dams, while finer grains flow through. Floating garbage is also trapped by check dams, increasing their effectiveness as water quality control measures.

Arid regions 

In arid areas, check dams are often built to increase groundwater recharge in a process called managed aquifer recharge. Winter runoff thus can be stored in aquifers, from which the water can be withdrawn during the dry season for irrigation, livestock watering, and drinking water. This is particularly useful for small settlements located far from a large urban center as check dams require less reliance on machinery, funding, or advanced knowledge compared to large-scale dam implementation.

Check dams can be used in combination with limans to stop and collect surface runoff water.

Mountainous regions 
As a strategy to stabilize mountain streams, the construction of check dams has a long tradition in many mountainous regions dating back to the 19th century in Europe. Steep slopes impede access by heavy construction machinery to mountain streams, so check dams have been built in place of larger dams. Because the typical high slope causes high flow velocity, a terraced system of multiple closely spaced check dams is typically necessary to reduce velocity and thereby counteract erosion. Such consolidation check dams, built in terraces, attempt to prevent both headward and downward cutting into channel beds while also stabilizing adjacent hill slopes. They are further used to mitigate flood and debris flow hazards.

Temporary Test Dams TTDs 
In the UK planning laws, applications and restrictions delay flood mitigation work.  This can be counteracted by setting up Temporary Test Dams in watercourses that can then be monitored and valued. This does however require the landowners support.  TTDs have proven to be a great way to get rapid action following a flood event and a way to get communities involved in the defence against future flood events.

Design considerations

Site 
Before installing a check dam, engineers inspect the site. Standard practices call for the drainage area to be ten acres or less. The waterway should be on a slope of no more than 50% and should have a minimum depth to bedrock of 2 ft. Check dams are often used in natural or constructed channels or swales. They should never be placed in live streams unless approved by appropriate local, state and/or federal authorities.

Materials 

Check dams are made of a variety of materials. Because they are typically used as temporary structures, they are often made of cheap and accessible materials such as rocks, gravel, logs, hay bales, and sandbags. Of these, logs and rock check dams are usually permanent or semi-permanent, and sandbag check dams are built primarily for temporary purposes. Also, there are check dams that are constructed with rockfill or wooden boards. Woven wire can be used to construct check dams in order to hold fine material in a gully. It is typically used in environments where the gully has a moderate slope (less than 10%), small drainage area, and in regions where flood flows do not typically carry large rocks or boulders. In nearly all instances, erosion control blankets, which are biodegradable open-weave blankets, are used in conjunction with check dams. These blankets help encourage vegetation growth on the slopes, shorelines and ditch bottoms.

Size 
This criteria induces a weir effect, resulting in increased water surface level upstream for some, if not all flow conditions.

Spacing 

In order to effectively slow water velocity to reduce erosion and to protect the channel between dams in a larger system, spacing must be designed properly. Check dams should be spaced such that the toe of the upstream check dam is equal to the elevation of the downstream check dam's crest. This allows water to pond between dams and substantially slows the flow's velocity.

Advantages 

Check dams are a highly effective practice to reduce flow velocities in channels and waterways. In contrast to big dams, check dams are implemented faster, are cost effective, and are smaller in scope. Because of this, their implementation does not typically displace people and communities nor do they destroy natural resources if designed correctly. Moreover, the dams are simple to construct and do not rely on advanced technologies, allowing their use in rural communities with fewer resources or access to technical expertise, as they have been in India's drylands for some time now.

Limitations 

Check dams still require maintenance and sediment removal practices. They become more difficult to implement on steep slopes, as velocity is higher and the distance between dams must be shortened. Check dams, depending on the material used, can have a limited life span but if implemented correctly can be considered permanent.

Maintenance 
Check dams require regular maintenance as typically temporary structures not designed to withstand long-term use. Dams should be inspected every week and after heavy rainfall. It is important that rubble, litter, and leaves are removed from the upstream side of the dam. This is typically done when the sediment has reached a height of one-half the original height of the dam.

When the site is permanently stabilized and the check dam is no longer needed, it is fully removed, including components washed downstream, and bare spots are stabilized.

See also
Drop structure
Gabion
Groyne
Nagashima Dam
Flexible debris-resisting barrier

References

External links 

 Trap Function of Bed Road by Steel-Slit Dam Sabo Gakkaishi Vol.45 (1992-1993) No.4 P22-29

Ecological restoration
Environmental engineering
Hydrology and urban planning
Landscape
Water conservation
Waste treatment technology
Water pollution
Dams by type
Desert greening